Crystal Bridges Museum of American Art is a museum of American art in Bentonville, Arkansas.  The museum, founded by Alice Walton and designed by Moshe Safdie, officially opened on 11 November 2011.  It offers free public admission.

Overview and founding
Alice Walton, the daughter of Walmart founder Sam Walton, spearheaded the Walton Family Foundation's involvement in developing Crystal Bridges. The museum's glass-and-wood design by architect Moshe Safdie and engineer Buro Happold features a series of pavilions nestled around two creek-fed ponds and forest trails. The soil is flinty silt loam derived from chert and cherty limestone and is mapped as Noark-Bendavis complex. The  complex includes galleries, meeting and classroom spaces, a library, a sculpture garden, a museum store designed by architect Marlon Blackwell, a restaurant and coffee bar, named Eleven after the day the museum opened, "11/11/11". Crystal Bridges also features a gathering space that can accommodate up to 300 people. Additionally, there are outdoor areas for concerts and public events, as well as extensive nature trails. It employs approximately 300 people, and is within walking distance of downtown Bentonville.

The museum has amassed $488 million in assets as of August 2008, an amount that will increase as more pieces are continually added to the museum's collection. It is the first major art museum (over $200 million endowment) to open in the United States since 1974. Over $317 million of the project's cost has been donated by Alice Walton. A 2013 Forbes ranking of the world's richest people placed the Walmart heiress at No. 16, with an estimated net worth of $26.3 billion.

In 2005, art historian John Wilmerding was hired for acquisition and advice on museum programming. Wilmerding commented that Alice Walton "will not spend at any cost" and will do her "homework on almost every individual acquisition and will ask for paperwork on market comparables". He stated that often when an artwork became available through a private sale, Walton would state 'Wait. It will come to auction where we can get it at a better price,' and she was usually correct. He also stated that the museum ranks at least in the top half dozen of American art museums. The museum's "quality and its range and depth already place it among one of the very best."

Headlines were generated after delays in construction and considerably higher costs for the museum than originally proposed to the city of Bentonville, Arkansas led to concerns about the favorable tax exemptions granted to the museum from the state in 2005 to secure its construction. Total tax losses to the state of Arkansas and the city of Bentonville are estimated at $17 million based on the financial disclosures given by the museum in the 2008 court case with Fisk University. The total amount of tax loss is estimated to have become considerably higher since then, but may never be disclosed due to the museum's guarded financial practices, including its decision not to disclose the amount spent since 2008 to secure collections, major art pieces, and lesser known works.   
However, the museum's IRS Form 990-PF notes acquisitions of $43.6 million during 2008, $81.9 million during 2007, $97.3 million in 2006.   Through 2008, the total art acquisitions were at least $222.8 million.

Don Bacigalupi was appointed director of the museum in August 2009. Previously, Robert G. Workman had served as director. In early May 2011, the museum announced three endowments by the Walton Family Foundation totaling $800 million. These endowments were established for operating expenses, acquisitions and capital improvements.  The operating endowment, totaling $350 million, is being used to contribute to the museum's base annual operating expenses expected to total between $16–20 million per year.  The acquisition endowment, totaling $325 million, will be used to fund additions to the museum's permanent collection.  The remaining $125 million will be used as a capital improvement endowment to fund future improvements to and maintenance of the museum.

Collaboration with other museums and institutions

In 2006, the museum partnered with the National Gallery of Art in an attempt to purchase Thomas Eakins' The Gross Clinic from Thomas Jefferson University. Under the terms of the agreement, the two museums agreed to pay a record $68 million, but the university gave Philadelphia 45 days to match the offer. The Philadelphia Museum of Art and Pennsylvania Academy of Fine Arts agreed to collectively match the offer and the painting remained in Philadelphia. The purchase forced both museums to sell some of their best Eakins pieces including Cowboy Singing and The Cello Player. In April 2007, Crystal Bridges acquired another Eakins belonging to Thomas Jefferson University entitled Portrait of Professor Benjamin H. Rand for an estimated $20 million.

Walton held talks with Randolph-Macon Woman's College in Lynchburg, Virginia in spring of 2007. The college was exploring selling part of the Maier Museum of Art's collection, but voted instead to sell select items from the collection at Christie's.

In 2006, Fisk University agreed to sell a 50% stake in a 101-piece Stieglitz collection to Crystal Bridges for $30 million. The collection was donated to the university by Georgia O'Keeffe in 1949. This agreement became tied up in a legal battle between Fisk University and the Georgia O'Keeffe Museum in New Mexico, but the museum withdrew its lawsuit. The Tennessee Attorney General attempted unsuccessfully to stop the sale. In October 2010, a judge ruled that a 50% stake in the collection could be sold to Crystal Bridges if modifications to the contract were made so that Fisk University could not lose its interest in the collection, nor could the joint venture holding ownership of the collection between Fisk University and Crystal Bridges be based in Delaware (or outside Tennessee Courts). The modified agreement would allow the works to stay at Fisk University until 2013 and then begin a two-year rotation with Crystal Bridges. In April 2012, the Tennessee Supreme Court upheld a lower court decision to allow the sale to move forward. A few months later on August 2, the Davidson County Chancery Court approval a Final Agreed Order that established joint ownership between Fisk University and Crystal Bridges through the newly established Stieglitz Art Collection, LLC. The operating agreement required Fisk University to set aside $3.9 million of the $30 million sale proceeds to be used to establish a fund for the care and maintenance of the collection at the Carl Van Vechten Gallery at Fisk University. The court dispute cost Fisk University $5.8 million in legal fees.

Since 2012, Crystal Bridges has participated in a four-year collaboration with the musée du Louvre in Paris, High Museum of Art in Atlanta, and the Terra Foundation for American Art. The resulting exhibitions are called American Encounters and feature works from the collections of all four partners. Each year, for the length of the collaboration, the museums develop the exhibition around a theme, such as portraiture. American Encounters has been seen in Paris, Bentonville, and Atlanta.

The Momentary

In early 2020, Crystal Bridges opened a satellite facility called The Momentary focused on visual and performing arts, culinary experiences, festivals, and artists-in-residence.

Permanent collection

The museum's permanent collection features American art from the Colonial era to the contemporary period.  All of the featured artists are United States citizens, though some spent most of their art careers in Europe.  Notable works include a Charles Willson Peale portrait of George Washington as well as paintings by George Bellows, Jasper Cropsey, Asher Durand, Thomas Eakins, Marsden Hartley, Winslow Homer, Eastman Johnson, Charles Bird King, John La Farge, Stuart Davis, Romare Bearden, Norman Rockwell, Mary McCleary, Agnes Pelton, and Walton Ford. Also included are works by Chuck Close, Jasper Johns, Alfred Maurer, Jackson Pollock, Tom Wesselmann and Andrew Wyeth. Two works, Richard Caton Woodville's War News from Mexico and Arthur Fitzwilliam Tait's The Life of a Hunter: A Tight Fix were included in American Stories: Paintings of Everyday Life, 1765–1915, a traveling exhibition organized by the Metropolitan Museum of Art. The Woodville painting was deaccessioned by the National Academy of Design, and was purchased in 1994 by Detroit collector Richard Manoogian.  The piece was later purchased in 2004 by Crystal Bridges.

In May 2005, the museum purchased a coveted Asher B. Durand landscape entitled Kindred Spirits from the New York Public Library for more than $35 million in a sealed auction. In September 2012, the museum announced the acquisition of a major 1960 painting by Mark Rothko entitled No. 210/No. 211 (Orange).  The abstract expressionist painting had been in a private Swiss collection since the 1960s and had only been shown in public twice.

Sculpture also figures prominently in the collection, on view in interior galleries and along outdoor sculpture trails. Sculptors represented in the permanent collection include Vanessa German, Paul Manship, Roxy Paine, Mark di Suvero, and James Turrell.

In January 2014 Crystal Bridges acquired the Bachman–Wilson House by architect Frank Lloyd Wright. The New Jersey house was dismantled and relocated to Bentonville.

Select auction results by date for items in the collection (including buyer's premium) are:

Green River, Wyoming by Thomas Moran, purchased 5 December 2002 for $2.9245 million
George Washington by Charles Willson Peale, purchased 18 May 2004 for $6.1675 million
Robert Louis Stevenson and his wife by John Singer Sargent, purchased 19 May 2004 for $8.8 million
Orca Bates by Jamie Wyeth, purchased 19 May 2004 for $360,000.
Portrait of Anne Page by Dennis Miller Bunker, purchased 1 December 2004 for $3.592 million
A French Music Hall by Everett Shinn, purchased 1 December 2004 for $7.848 million
The Indian and the Lily by George de Forest Brush, purchased 1 December 2004 for $4.824 million
The Studio by George Bellows, purchased 1 December 2004 for $2.472 million
Spring by Winslow Homer, purchased 1 December 2004 for $2.024 million
Ottoe Half Chief, Husband of Eagle of Delight by Charles Bird King, purchased 1 December 2004 for $1.352 million
Wai-Kee-Chai, Sanky Chief, Crouching Eagle by Charles Bird King, purchased 1 December 2004 for $792,000
Portrait of Carolus Duran by John Singer Sargent, purchased 2 December 2004 for $724,300
Sick Puppy by Norman Rockwell, purchased 2 December 2004 for $511,500
George Washington (The Constable-Hamilton Portrait) by Gilbert Stuart, purchased 30 November 2005 for $8.136 million
Mrs. Theodore Atkinson, Jr. by John Singleton Copley, purchased 30 November 2005 for $3.376 million
Marquis de Lafayette by Samuel F. B. Morse, purchased 30 November 2005 for $1.36 million
Winter Scene in Brooklyn by Francis Guy, purchased 30 November 2005 for $1.024 million
Rose Garden by Maria Oakey Dewing, purchased 24 May 2006 for $2.032 million
The Lantern Bearers by Maxfield Parrish, purchased 25 May 2006 for $4.272 million
Dr. William Smith by Gilbert Stuart, purchased 23 May 2007 for $1.888 million
Still Life with Stretcher, Mirror, Bowl of Fruit by Roy Lichtenstein, purchased 20 June 2007 for £4.052 million (US$8.055 million – based on 20 June 2007 exchange rates)
Homage to the Square: Joy by Josef Albers, purchased 14 November 2007 for $1.497 million
View of Mount Etna by Thomas Cole, purchased 29 November 2007 for $541,000
Cupid and Psyche by Benjamin West, purchased 28 January 2009 for $458,500
Our Town by Kerry James Marshall, purchased 13 May 2009 for $782,500
Supine Woman by Wayne Thiebaud, purchased 12 November 2009 for $1.818 million
Portrait of a Girl and Her Dog in a Grape Arbor by Susan Catherine Moore Waters purchased 7 March 2010 for $41,475
Portrait of Martha Graham by Marisol Escobar, purchased 13 May 2010 for $116,500
Dolly Parton by Andy Warhol, purchased 14 May 2010 for $914,500
Standing Explosion (Red) by Roy Lichtenstein, purchased 14 May 2010 for $722,500
The Return of the Gleaner by Winslow Homer, purchased 19 May 2010 for $2.2105 million
Trinity by Adolph Gottlieb, purchased 11 May 2011 for $1.1425 million
Hammer and Sickle by Andy Warhol, purchase 13 November 2012 for $3.4425 million
Untitled, 1989 (Bernstein 89 24) by Donald Judd, purchased 14 November 2012 for $10.1625 million
Blackwell's Island by Edward Hopper, purchased 23 May 2013 for $19.1638 million
Coca-Cola [3] by Andy Warhol, purchased 12 November 2013 for $57.3 million
Flag by Jasper Johns, purchased 11 November 2014 for $36.005 million
No. 210/211 (Orange) by Mark Rothko, purchased 11 November 2014 for $44.965 million 
Jimson Weed/White Flower No. 1 by Georgia O'Keeffe, purchased 20 November 2014 for $44.405 million
Miss Liberty by Robert Colescott, purchased on 17 February 2023 for $4.5 million

Selected works in the museum collection by chronological order

References

External links

Architectural Record, Crystal Bridges Museum of American Art, Safdie Architects, commentary, slide show, and drawings, January 2012
TimePhotos (Time magazine), Crystal Bridges Museum of American Art, photos, 21 November 2011
Bridges Acquires New Work by Walton Ford
'A Billionaire’s Eye for Art Shapes Her Singular Museum', Carol Vogel, The New York Times, 16 June 2011
American Art Artnews 1/12/2012
Virtual tour of the Crystal Bridges Museum provided by Google Arts & Culture

Art museums and galleries in Arkansas
Museums in Benton County, Arkansas
Buildings and structures in Bentonville, Arkansas
Museums of American art
2011 establishments in Arkansas
Art museums established in 2011
Moshe Safdie buildings